The 2006 United States Senate election in Nevada was held on November 7, 2006. Incumbent Republican John Ensign defeated Democratic nominee Jack Carter to win re-election to a second term.

Republican primary

Candidates

Nominee 
 John Ensign, incumbent U.S. Senator

Defeated in primary 
 Ed Hamilton, businessman

Results

Democratic primary 
Popular Las Vegas mayor Oscar Goodman had said in January 2006 that he would probably run, but decisively ruled out a run in late April. Going into the 2006 cycle, many top Nevada Democrats such as State Assembly speaker Richard Perkins indicated that the party would put more efforts into the gubernatorial election than into defeating Ensign.

Candidates

Nominee 
 Jack Carter, Navy veteran and son of President Jimmy Carter

Defeated in primary 
 Ruby Jee Tun, middle school science teacher

Declined to run 

 Oscar Goodman, Mayor of Las Vegas
 Frankie Sue Del Papa, Attorney General of Nevada
 Dina Titus, member of the Nevada Senate (ran for Governor)

Results

General election

Candidates 
 Jack Carter (D), Navy veteran and son of President Jimmy Carter
 John Ensign (R), incumbent U.S. Senator
 David Schumann (I), retired financial analyst, 2004 nominee, and 2002 state senator nominee
 Brendan Trainor (L), state party chair, airline quality manager, and frequent candidate

Campaign 
Carter's advantages included his formidable speaking abilities and kinship with a former U.S. President. On the other hand, Ensign was also considered to be an effective speaker and as of the first quarter of 2006, held an approximately 5-1 advantage over Carter in cash-on-hand.

Debates
Complete video of debate, October 15, 2006

Predictions

Polling

Results 

Ensign won a majority of the votes in every county in the state, with his lowest percentage at 53%.

See also 
 2006 United States Senate elections

References

External links 
 Ensign campaign site
 Trainor campaign site

Nevada
2006
2006 Nevada elections